Aåk Andersson (18 August 1906 – 19 March 1982) was a Swedish footballer. He made one appearance for Sweden and eight Allsvenskan appearances for Djurgårdens IF.

References 

Swedish footballers
IFK Eskilstuna players
Djurgårdens IF Fotboll players
1906 births
1982 deaths
Association football forwards